The Djakunda were an indigenous Australian people of the state of Queensland.

Country
Their northern limits lay around Hawkwood, which their southern reaches bordered the Great Dividing Range and the area close to Kumbia. Part of their territory was forested with the important ceremonial food source, the bunya pine.

Language
Norman Tindale claimed that the Djakunda language bore resemblances to Mbabaram, and suggested also that their small stature was reminiscent of the hypothetical Barrinean people whose existence he, together with Joseph Birdsell, had posited in the late 1930s.

Alternative names
 Djakanda
 Djaka-nde
 Dakundair

Notes

Citations

Sources

Aboriginal peoples of Queensland